Vernante is a comune (municipality) in the Province of Cuneo in the Italian region Piedmont, located about  south of Turin and about  south of Cuneo.

The municipality of Vernante contains the frazione (subdivision) Palanfrè.

Vernante borders the following municipalities: Boves, Entracque, Limone Piemonte, Roaschia, and Robilante.

Demographic evolution

References

Cities and towns in Piedmont